Robert King Fong (born 1960) is a United States Democratic Party politician who is a former member of the Sacramento City Council. He was first elected to that post in 2004 and was reelected in 2008 without opposition.  In December 2012, he was replaced by Steve Hansen.

Education
Fong is an alumnus of the University of California where he received his undergraduate degree and the University of California at Davis law school where he received his Juris Doctor.

Board of education
Fong served on the Sacramento City Unified School District Board of Education for 6 years from 1998 until 2004. When he initially ran for the board, Fong was part of a slate of candidates put up by the late mayor Joe Serna who was attempting to have more control over the struggling, urban school district. He was the president of the board from 2000 until he resigned to take his council seat in 2004.

Issues Facing the Board
During his time on the board, several controversial issues were dealt with including but not limited to charter schools, teacher contracts, and the California Administrative Services Authority (CASA), a pension plan for top administrators that many considered legally questionable.

With regards to charter schools, the primary issue was the closure of Sacramento High School, the city's oldest high school, and letting St. HOPE, an organization run by Kevin Johnson a former NBA star who is now Sacramento's mayor take it over. Due to his support of the conversion, Fong had a recall drive looming against him by the Take Back Our Schools Committee.

In regards to the pension plan, CalPERS, the public employee retirement system in California found that the plan was invalid and that the district owed millions to the retirement system. Another audit found it legally questionable and that it possibly left the district owing ten million dollars in liability.

Other Community Service
Fong has served as the president of the Asian American Bar Association of Sacramento. He also served on the Asian Pacific Chamber of Commerce board of directors. He was also a board member of the Central Valley Regional Water Quality Control Board.

2004 Election
Fong declared his candidacy for the 4th district council seat which covers much of the Land Park area of Sacramento after Jimmie Yee, who had served on the city council since 1992 except for a brief stint in 2000 announced that he was not going to run again. Fong faced minimal opposition, garnering 77% of the vote to his opponent, Joan King's,  23% of the vote. Joan King, a PR consultant, had been one of the people who attempted to pursue the recall bid against Fong for his actions on the school board.

Arena Tax
Fong was a big proponent along with then mayor Heather Fargo of Measures Q and R which were on the 2006 ballot that would have levied a sales tax against Sacramento residents in order to build a new arena for the Sacramento Kings at the Railyards in Downtown Sacramento.

2008 Election
Fong faced no opposition in his bid for reelection in 2008. The race that garnered a significant amount of attention in Sacramento was the mayoral race between Heather Fargo and Kevin Johnson. Fong decided to support Fargo, the incumbent,

References

Chavez, Erika "Fong will leave school board at end of April - Trustee wants to prepare for new post as city councilman," Sacramento Bee, 3 April 2004. Page B4
Chavez, Erika "Group drops bid to recall Fong - Members felt a special election would be costly - and pointless if he won his City Council race," Sacramento Bee, 7 January 2004.
Jewett, Christina "Fong rival pushed to get him recalled - School board chief faces Joan King in City Council race," Sacramento Bee, 17 February 2004.
News & Review Article on the Arena Tax

1960 births
University of California, Davis alumni
Sacramento City Council members
Living people